Francis Ebejer (28 August 1925, Dingli — 10 June 1993, St Julian's) was a Maltese dramatist and novelist.

Francis Ebejer was the father of the Maltese painter Damian Ebejer

Biography
Ebejer studied medicine at the University of Malta between 1942 and 1943 before abandoning the course to work as an English-Italian interpreter with the 8th Army of the British Forces in Tripolitania, North Africa (1943–44). After the war he became a teacher in England. Upon completion of St Mary's Training College, Strawberry Hill, Twickenham (1948–50), he was appointed a primary school head teacher in Malta, a post he held till 1977.

Ebejer wrote seven full-length novels in English, and another one in Maltese, all published. His final novel, The Maltese Baron and I Lucian was published in 2002, nine years after the author's death. Other novels by Ebejer include A Wreath of Maltese Innocents (1958), Wild Spell of Summer (1968), In the Eye of the Sun (1969), Come Again in Spring: Requiem for a Malta Fascist (1980), and Leap of Malta Dolphins (1982). He wrote the Maltese rumanzett entitled Il-Ħarsa ta' Rużann. Several university students have written their theses for laureateships and doctorates in English on his works.

Ebejer was the leading Maltese dramatist of the second half of the 20th century, having written over fifty plays, the majority in Maltese, for the stage, television and radio, several of them recipients of literary and dramatic awards. In the 1950s he wrote mostly for the radio, the sixties and the seventies saw the more mature Ebejer producing most of his stageplays for Malta's National Theatre, the Manoel Theatre in Valletta. His three great works, Vaganzi tas-Sajf (1962, Summer holidays), Boulevard (1964), and Menz (1967) were a great success.

Vaganzi tas-Sajf, a play in three Acts, is one of his best known dramas, and has been translated into French, Italian and German, and published respectively in France, Italy, and Malta. Menz was performed in Spain, Tokyo and Venice.

Ebejer experimented much with the theatre. In Boulevard, for example, he experiments with the idea of the absurd, using language to smash the stability of tradition. Another concept he introduced in Malta is the thesis play. In Menz, for instance, he discusses the usefulness of individual freedom within a social system that imposes rigidity; in Vaganzi tas-Sajf man has to look for internal peace within the bounds of his own experience and maturity; and in L-Imwarrbin (1973, The Cliffhangers) he sets the past in confrontation with the present to reveal the workings of the individual conscience and makes use of the play-within-a-play technique to retain the link with reality.

Ebejer received many awards and titles in Malta and abroad for his literary works. He received the Malta Literary Award four times, the Phoenicia Cultural Trophy and the Cheyney Award. In 1985, the Municipality and University of the French city of Avignon awarded him La Medaille d'Honneur de la Ville d'Avignon in recognition of his contribution to literature and the theatre.

In 1961 Ebejer became a Fellow of the English Centre of International P.E.N. Between 1961 and 1962 he became a Fulbright Scholar (USA). He was also a member of the Academy of Maltese Writers.

References

Further reading
 Documentary about Francis Ebejer
 World Literature Today, U.S.A., 1983
 Peter Nazareth, In the Trickster Tradition: The Novels of Andrew Salkey, Francis Ebejar and Ishmael Reed, Bogle L'Ouverture Press, 1994.

Maltese male novelists
1925 births
1993 deaths
Alumni of St Mary's University, Twickenham
People from Dingli
20th-century Maltese novelists
Maltese dramatists and playwrights
English-language writers from Malta